Mayboroda, Maiboroda or Majboroda is a Slavic surname (Cyrillic: Майборода). People with this name include:
Andrei Mayboroda (born 1984), Russian football player
Dmitry Mayboroda, Russian pianist, bronze medalist at Eurovision Young Musicians 2006
Heorhiy Maiboroda (1913–1992), Ukrainian composer, brother of Platon
Platon Maiboroda (1918–1989), Ukrainian composer, brother of Heorhiy
Serhiy Mayboroda (born 1997), Ukrainian football player
Svitlana Mayboroda (born 1981), Ukrainian mathematician
Yulia Mayboroda (born 1980), Russian actress